The Rodney Crowell Collection is the title of the first compilation album by American country music artist Rodney Crowell. It was released in 1989 (see 1989 in country music) by Crowell's former label, Warner Bros. Records, following the huge success of his album Diamonds & Dirt. It features selections from his first three albums that were released under the Warner Bros. label between 1978 and 1981. It charted #65 on the Top Country Albums chart.

The album is the first release of Crowell singing "I Don't Have to Crawl"  The Crowell-penned tune was recorded by Emmylou Harris and released in 1981 on her album. Evangeline.  Crowell recorded his version in 1984 for what was to be a new album for Warner Bros., Street Language.  That album was never released and instead was re-recorded in 1986 for Crowell's new label, Columbia, but without "I Don't Have to Crawl".

Track listing
Tracklengths vary slightly from album versions with no change to the actual song.
"Ashes by Now" (Rodney Crowell) - 4:09
"'Til I Gain Control Again" (Crowell) - 5:07
"Voilá, An American Dream" (Crowell) - 3:49
"Queen of Hearts" (Hank DeVito) - 3:39
"Shame on the Moon" (Crowell) - 4:35
"Old Pipeliner" (Tommy Hill, Ray King) - 2:59
"Stars on the Water" (Crowell) - 3:42
"Heartbroke" (Guy Clark) - 3:33
"I Don't Have to Crawl" (Crowell) - 3:59
"Leaving Louisiana in the Broad Daylight" (Donivan Cowart, Rodney Crowell) - 3:24
"Victim or a Fool" (Crowell) - 2:57
"I Ain't Living Long Like This" (Crowell) - 4:50

Notes
Tracks 3, 10 & 12 taken from Ain't Living Long Like This (1978)
Tracks 1, 4 & 8 taken from But What Will the Neighbors Think (1980)
Tracks 2, 5 - 7 & 11 taken from Rodney Crowell (1981)
Track 9 previously unreleased

Chart performance

Sources

CMT
Allmusic (see infobox)
AOL Music profile

Rodney Crowell albums
1989 compilation albums
Warner Records compilation albums